The Jervis Shopping Centre is a major shopping centre in Dublin, Ireland. Opened in 1996, the centre is located in the area bordered by Jervis Street, Upper Abbey Street, Mary Street, and Liffey Street. The centre has a total of 70 stores including clothing, food and electrical outlets.

History
The centre was built on a 12,000 m2 (3-acre) former hospital site, which was bought in 1994 at a cost of £5.97 million. The centre was built at a cost of £76 million. Most of the facade of the former Hospital was retained and incorporated into the Shopping Centre. The centre opened in 1996 and extends to 37,000 m2. The centre was originally anchored by Debenhams, Marks & Spencer and Tesco, and contains a 750-space car park. The property is located on Mary Street, one of Ireland's busiest streets.

Although its main entrance is on Mary Street, the centre is named for the Jervis Street Hospital on whose site it was built following the hospital's closure in the late-1980s. The existing Marks and Spencer store on Mary Street was incorporated into the new centre, with the other anchor tenants being Quinnsworth (now Tesco) and New Look in the unit formerly occupied by Debenhams.

The centre is notable in that, as the first major shopping centre opened during the economic boom of the late-1990s, it marked the first appearance of many British retailers on main streets in Ireland. These included: Boots, Dixons, Debenhams, Next, and Argos among others, some of which have gone on to become major names in Ireland. This contrasted with existing Irish shopping centres at the time which were usually anchored by Irish retailers such as Dunnes, Roches Stores (since taken over by Debenhams), and Penneys. Not all of the new arrivals were successful. British Home Stores opened a store in 1996 having previously sold all of their Irish interests to Primark; however, the outlet was not a success and was later sold to Heatons.

The centre was one of the first to introduce the food court concept to Ireland, with outlets including: KFC, Spud U Like, and Harry Ramsden's. Other major restaurants in the centre include Burger King. The centre is owned by Paddy McKillen, Padraig Drayne and Paschal Taggart.

Public transport
The shopping centre is on the Luas Red line, with the Jervis Luas stop right outside the building.

Notes

External links
 Official site

Shopping centres in County Dublin
Buildings and structures in Dublin (city)
Abbey Street